Thank Evans is a 1938 British comedy film directed by Roy William Neill and starring Max Miller.  The film is sequel to Educated Evans (1936), with Miller, Hal Walters and Albert Whelan all returning to reprise their roles as the hapless horse racing tipster Evans, his pal Nobby and the bungling Sergeant Challoner.  The outline of the plot concerns Evans being once again down on his luck, and at the racecourse meeting a friendly and sympathetic Lord who helps him out.  Later Evans manages to repay the gentleman's kindness by exposing his horse trainer as a duplicitous con-merchant.

Thank Evans is classed as "missing, believed lost", with only a one-minute fragment known to survive.

Cast
 Max Miller as Educated Evans
 Hal Walters as Nobby
 Albert Whelan as Sgt. Challoner
 Polly Ward as Rosie
 John Carol as Harry
 Robert Rendel as Lord Claverley
 Glen Alyn as Brenda
 Freddie Watts as Mulcay
 Harvey Braban as Inspector Pine
 Aubrey Mallalieu as Magistrate

References

External links 
 

1938 films
1938 comedy films
British comedy films
Films based on works by Edgar Wallace
Films directed by Roy William Neill
British horse racing films
British black-and-white films
Lost British films
1938 lost films
Lost comedy films
1930s British films